The Circle Club is a private members' club in central Manchester, England. It is owned by Northern Quarter-based clothing company Ringspun, who also hold various parties at the venue. Originally set up to serve those working in the city's growing media industry, the club underwent a change of management and relaxed its membership criteria in 2008 to those working in professional services. However, it is still most often frequented by those involved in media and fashion, by virtue of the events it holds. The Club was announced in late 2013 to close in December.

Unusually, the exterior of the club carries no signage and is not apparent to passers-by. It is accessible via an unmarked dark green door on the Barton Square alleyway, close to Barton Arcade. It has been the venue for a number of notable events in the city in recent times, including debates featuring leaders of Manchester and Salford city councils, Ian Simpson (architect of the Beetham Tower) as well as parties for Channel M television programmes and the Miss Manchester beauty pageant.

External links
 The Circle Club
 Circle Club on World's Best Bars
 Review from What Happened Last Night

Buildings and structures in Manchester
Nightclubs in Manchester